Saralasin is a competitive angiotensin II receptor antagonist with partial agonist activity. The aminopeptide sequence for saralasin differs from angiotensin II at three sites. At position 1, sarcosine replaces aspartic acid increasing the affinity for vascular smooth muscle receptors and making the peptide resistant to degradation by aminopeptidases Pals et al (1979). At position 5, isoleucine is replaced by valine, and at position 8, phenylalanine is replaced by alanine which leads to a smaller stimulatory effect. Saralasin was used to distinguish renovascular hypertension from essential hypertension prior to its discontinuation in January, 1984 because of a number of false-positive and false-negative reports Hutchison and Shahan (2004).

External links
 
 
 
 

Enzyme inhibitors
Peptides